The Leader of the Opposition is the politician who leads the official opposition in  the Bihar Legislative Assembly. Incumbent Leader of opposition is Vijay Kumar Sinha.

Leaders of the opposition

See also 
List of leaders of the opposition in the Bihar Legislative Council

References 

Bihari politicians
Bihar